Dche (Ԭ ԭ; italics: Ԭ ԭ) is a letter of the Cyrillic script. The shape of the letter originated as a ligature of the Cyrillic letters De (Д д Д д) and Che (Ч ч Ч ч).

Dche was used in an old orthography of the Komi language.

Usage
This letter represents the voiced alveolo-palatal affricate . It can be romanized as ⟨đ⟩.

It was used chiefly in northeastern European Russia by the Komi language of the Komi peoples.

Computing codes

See also 
Cyrillic characters in Unicode
Komi language

References